Finding Bigfoot is a documentary television series on Animal Planet. It premiered on May 29, 2011, and began its eighth season on January 3, 2016. The program follows four researchers and explorers investigating potential evidence of Bigfoot, a cryptid hominid allegedly living in the wildernesses of the United States and Canada. As of January 2016, the team has discovered multiple hair samples, which DNA shows as an 'unidentified primate', however they have failed to find any hard evidence of Bigfoot's existence.

Series overview

Episodes

Season 1 (2011)

Season 2 (2011–12)

Season 3 (2012–13)

Season 4 (2013–14)

Season 5 (2014)

Season 6 (2014–15)

Season 7 (2015)

Season 8 (2016)

Season 9 (2017)

References

Finding Bigfoot
Bigfoot
Bigfoot films